Patrick Street is a street in the medieval area of Dublin, Ireland.

Location
Patrick Street runs from Nicholas Street at the north to New Street at the south. It runs parallel to Bride Street.

History

Originally recorded as St Patrick's Street from 1285, the thoroughfare was named for St Patrick's Church, which was later replaced with St Patrick's Cathedral.

In the mid-20th century, the junction of Patrick Street, New Street, Kevin Street and Dean Street was referred to as "the Four Corners of Hell", in reference to four notorious pubs on each corner in this area of The Liberties. When the pubs closed the influx of people led to rowdy behaviour and street fights. The four pubs, now all demolished, were Kenny's, Quinn's, O'Beirne's and Lowe's.

Road widening 
The road widening of Patrick Street, Nicholas Street, and High Street has been viewed as resulting in this medieval area of Dublin becoming fragmented and difficult to navigate as a pedestrian.

References

Streets in Dublin (city)